Handeni District is one of the 11 districts of Tanga Region in Tanzania. It is bordered to the west by the Kilindi District and the Handeni Urban District, to the north by the Korogwe District, to the east by the Pangani District, and to the south by the Pwani Region. In 2002 Kilindi District was formed out of the district. The administrative capital of the district is Mkata town. According to the 2002 Tanzania National Census, the population of the Handeni District was 248,633. According to the 2012 census, the population had increased to: 276,646.

Administrative subdivisions
As of 2012, Handeni District Council was administratively divided into 20 wards.

Wards

In pop culture
The dramatic open area to the north of Handeni was the setting for Ernest Hemingway's classic hunting book, Green Hills of Africa.

References

Districts of Tanga Region